St. Patrick's Cathedral may refer to:

Australia
St Patrick's Basilica, Fremantle, Western Australia
St Patrick's Cathedral, Ballarat, Roman Catholic Diocese of Ballarat, Victoria
St Patrick's Cathedral, Melbourne, Victoria
St Patrick's Cathedral, Parramatta, New South Wales
St Patrick's Cathedral, Toowoomba, Queensland
St Patrick's Cathedral, Bunbury, Western Australia

Barbados
St. Patrick's Cathedral, Bridgetown

Canada
St. Patrick's Basilica, Montreal, Quebec
St Patrick's Basilica, Ottawa, Ontario
St. Patrick's Cathedral, Thunder Bay, Ontario
St. Patrick's Church, St. John's, Newfoundland

India
 St Patrick's Cathedral, Pune

Northern Ireland
St Patrick's Cathedral, Armagh (Church of Ireland)
St Patrick's Cathedral, Armagh (Roman Catholic)

Republic of Ireland
St Patrick's Cathedral, Dublin
St Patrick's Cathedral, Trim, County Meath
St. Patrick's Cathedral, Skibbereen
St Patrick's Cathedral, Killala

Lesotho
St. Patrick's Cathedral, Mohale's Hoek

Madagascar
St Patrick's Cathedral, Andranomena, Toliara

United States

Our Lady of La Vang Parish, formerly Saint Patrick Proto-Cathedral Parish, California
Cathedral of Saint Patrick (Norwich, Connecticut)
St. Patrick's Co-Cathedral (Billings, Montana)
Pro-Cathedral of Saint Patrick in Newark, New Jersey
St. Patrick's Cathedral (Midtown Manhattan), New York City
St. Patrick's Old Cathedral, Lower Manhattan, New York City
Cathedral of Saint Patrick (Charlotte, North Carolina)
Cathedral of Saint Patrick (Harrisburg, Pennsylvania)
Cathedral Parish of Saint Patrick (El Paso, Texas)
St. Patrick Cathedral (Fort Worth, Texas)

Elsewhere
St Patrick's Cathedral, Auckland, New Zealand
Saint Patrick's Cathedral, Karachi, Pakistan

Other 
"St. Patrick's Cathedral", instrumental pieces of music on The Dubliners' album Further Along from 1996

See also
Saint Patrick
Saint Patrick's Day
Saint Patrick (disambiguation)
St. Patrick's Church (disambiguation)